Ab Konar or Abkenar may refer to:
 Abkenar, Gilan
 Ab Konar, Khuzestan